Thea is a fictional character that appears in the NEW-GEN comic books published by Marvel Comics. Created by Chris Matonti, J.D. Matonti, and Julia Coppola, she first appeared in NEW-GEN #1 (2010). She is the wife of Gabriel, mother to the twins Sean and Chris, and one of principal educators for the A.P.N.G.

Fictional character biography

Deadalus' Betrayal
Thea was a guardian of the natural environment of New-Gen for a long time before Gabriel began enhancing the world with nanotechnology. Working in concert, they were able to unify both the scientific and natural aspects of New-Gen into a utopian futuristic paradise. However, Sylvester Deadalus, Gabriel's apprentice, and colleague betrayed his mentor and released an enormous swarm of bio-manipulative nanobots onto the people of New-Gen. These nanobots mutated the bodies of those they came into contact with, giving them superpowers and enhanced abilities. After a fierce battle Gabriel eventually triumphed and banished Deadalus to the underworld as punishment. As a precaution, to protect them from Deadalus should he ever return to New-Gen, Gabriel decided to send his sons to live and be raised in present-day New York City on Earth. Before he sent them there, Gabriel expressed concern that their bodies had also been affected by Deadalus' nanobot infestation, although they showed no outward signs of this being the case. Thea was very opposed to this plan, and was bitter towards Gabriel for making the call.

Departure and Return
After Gabriel sent away their children, Thea became despondent and bitter. She left Gabriel for a time, leaving the technologically advanced city which they called their home to return to her place of birth, in the untouched natural part of the world. She eventually did return to find that Gabriel was having trouble effectively training the children he took in with the aim of creating the A.P.N.G. Thea, knowing Gabriel meant well, took over the duty of teaching them their school-related subjects, while Gabriel supervised combat and tactics exercises. Although they seemed to have made peace, Thea was still angry at Gabriel for having sent Sean and Chris away.

Observing the Battle
When Deadalus emerged from the underworld onto Zadaar III, transformed by microbots into the insane and brutal Sly, Gabriel sent Mini, Flyer, Gazelle, Diamond, and Roboduck to fight and dispatch him. As he and Thea watched from Gabriel's command center on New-Gen, Gabriel also noticed their sons on Earth having fitful visions of the battle. Gabriel prepared to depart and join the fray himself, carrying with him six green orbs containing highly advanced nanotechnology. As Gabriel fought alongside the A.P.N.G., Thea observed that Sean and Chris' adoptive parents perceived that the twins "time had come," as more bizarre things began happening to them. Thea realized that Gabriel's hypothesis that the twins had been infected by Deadalus' nanobots was correct, and that they were developing powers.

Powers, abilities, and equipment
Thea possesses the ability to see into the future, as well as to other points in the time-space continuum, much like her son Sean seems to be able to. She also seems to possess the ability to levitate herself and other objects

References

External links 
 https://web.archive.org/web/20110707153446/http://apngenterprises.com/comic/characters-of-new-gen/
 http://www.comicvine.com/thea/29-69834/

Fictional characters with precognition